Ernest Jann (born 3 October 1931) was a Luxembourgian footballer. He played in 13 matches for the Luxembourg national football team from 1957 to 1961.

References

External links
 

1931 births
Possibly living people
Luxembourgian footballers
Luxembourg international footballers
Place of birth missing (living people)
Association footballers not categorized by position